Cudworth railway station was a railway station that served Cudworth, South Yorkshire, England.

History
The station was built by the North Midland Railway and opened in 1840. It was originally called Barnsley and is referred to in Allens Guide as Barnsley Station at Cudworth Bridge. – Omnibus to Barnsley  miles on the left.

Roughly  further north, was the line's first crossing of the Barnsley Canal.

In 1885 the station was extended with an extra platform for the Hull and Barnsley Railway, which passed through but was not connected to the Midland system until the next century.

The station closed to passengers in 1968.  In 1988 the line from Wath Road Junction to Cudworth was closed due to mining subsidence.

Accidents and incidents
In 1843 a North Midland Railway luggage train collided with the rear of a stationary train in fog. 
On 19 January 1905, once again in fog, a Midland Railway express passenger train overran signals and collided with a passenger train. Seven people were killed.

References

Former Hull and Barnsley Railway stations
Disused railway stations in Barnsley
Railway stations in Great Britain opened in 1840
Railway stations in Great Britain closed in 1968
Former Midland Railway stations
Beeching closures in England